Ennan Memutovich Alimov (1912–1941) was a Crimean Tatar writer and artist.

Biography
After graduating from a nine-year rural school, he worked at a tobacco factory. In 1933, Alimov entered the art studio of Nikolay Samokish, graduating in 1936. Alimov left the studio to serve at the front after the invasion of the Soviet Union. He was killed in action in 1941 as a senior sergeant.

Alimov's original paintings did not survive. Reproductions of his paintings Bagydzhy kyzlar ("Girls-growers"), Ormanda tan ("Dawn in the forest"), and Kaytarma oynagyan kyz ("Girl dancing haitarma") were published between 1933 and 1936 in Yash Kuvet and Komsomolskaya Pravda.

Between 1936 and 1941, Alimov's stories "Native Village", "The Turtle Dove Flaps Her Wings" and "Fishermen" were published. The main character of the story "The Turtle Dove Flaps Her Wings" was based on his lover Emine Smedlyaeva and discussed the first love of a teenager with descriptions of her in comparison to rain and the colors of a forest. Alimov's poems "My Homeland" and "Meeting the Dawn" were published in the newspaper Literary Crimea.

Literature 
 Panova Z. S. Development of the genre of the story in the Crimean Tatar literature of the 30s. of the XX century (on the example of E. Alimov's story "The turtledove flaps its wing") // Uchenye zapiski Taurida National University im. V. I. Vernadsky. - 2013. - T. 26 (65), No. 1. - Part 1. - S. 192-195. — (Series "Philology. Social Communications").
 Veliulaeva A. Kyrymtatar edebiyaty: 6-nji son. - Akmesdzhit, 1998.
 "I will not forget anyone..." / Collection of works of Crimean Tatar writers 1913-1940. - Simferopol, 2001.

References

1912 births
1941 deaths
Soviet male writers
Soviet painters
Male painters
People from Bilohirsk Raion
Crimean Tatar writers
Soviet military personnel killed in World War II